The Kendall Central School District is a public school district in New York State that serves approximately 684 students in the town of Kendall and portions of the towns of Carlton, Holley and Murray in Orleans County; and portions of the towns of Clarkson and Hamlin in Monroe County, with over 150 employees and an operating budget of $14 million (~$0 per student).

The average class size is about 55 students and the student-teacher ratio is 16:1 (elementary), 23:1 (middle-high school).
The smallest class size in school history was the Physics class during the 2022 school year, with 1 student.

Nicolas Picardo is the Superintendent of Schools. He was formerly the athletic director at the Kendall Central School District.

Board of education
The Board of Education (BOE) consists of 6 members who serve rotating 5-year terms. Elections are held each May for board members to vote on the School District Budget.

Nadine Hanlon - President
Lisa Levett - Vice President
Jason ReQua - Trustee
Chaley Swift - Trustee
Charles Patt - Trustee
Connie Rockow - BOCES Representative

Former superintendents
Mr. Harold R. Osbourne
Mr. David J. Doyle
Mr. Harlow D. Fisher
Dr. Michael C. O'Laughlin–2000–2007 (Principal - Kendall Junior/Senior High School, named Superintendent of Monroe II - Orleans BOCES, died in 2010)
Julie Christensen

Kendall Junior/Senior High School

David J. Doyle Kendall Junior/Senior High School is located at 16887 Roosevelt Highway and serves grades 7–12. The current principal is Mrs. Carol D'Agostino, and the current middle school principal is Mrs. Melissa Strelick. Approximately in 2020-2021 52 students at 16% enrolled as seventh graders, 48 students at 14% registered as eighth graders, 63 students at 19% enrolled as Freshmen, 59 students at 18% enrolled as Sophomores, 63 students at 19% enrolled as Juniors, and 49 students at 15% enrolled as Seniors.

Former Junior/Senior Highschool principals
Previous assignment and reason for departure denoted in parentheses
Harold R. Osbourne
David Doyle (unknown, named Superintendent of Kendall Central School)
Frank W. Clow
Michael C. O'Laughlin–1986-2000 (Administrative Assistant - Kendall Central School, named Superintendent of Kendall Central School District)
Michael J. Richter–2000-2002 (Assistant Principal - Twelve Corners Middle School, named Principal of Waterloo High School)
Scott Mac Donnell–2002–2003 [interim]
Ty E. Zinkiewich–2003-2005 (Assistant Principal - Odyssey Academy, named Principal of Spencerport High School)

Elementary school

Kendall Elementary School is located at 1932 Kendall Road and serves grades K through 6. The current principal is Kevin Watson.

Former elementary school principals
Previous assignment and reason for departure denoted in parentheses
Glenn Stofka (unknown, retired)
Richard L. Suhr (unknown, retired)
Scott A. Wright 2001-2012 (unknown, retired)
Sharon Smith 2012-2019 (unknown, retired)
Heather Eysaman 2019-2021 (unknown, retired)

References

11. https://data.nysed.gov/evaluation.php?year=2016&instid=800000050758&report=appr

External links
Kendall Central School District Website
New York State School Boards Association

School districts in New York (state)
Education in Orleans County, New York